Julien Labrousse (born 9 October 1977), is a French entrepreneur and architect, particular owner and manager of two Parisian theaters Elysée Montmartre and Le Trianon. He specializes in the creation of cultural venues. In 2005 he bought and heavily reformed Hôtel du Nord, building listed as an historical monument, a place which is known to have inspired Marcel Carné's 1938 feature film. Then in 2009 he bought with Abel Nahmias, the Theatre Le Trianon. It carries a heavy restoration of the building. Then it was the turn of the Elysee Montmartre, which he bought in 2014, destroyed after a major fire. He realizes the complete reconstruction of the Theater.

Life

Early life 
He was born and raised in Paris, France, he began his professional career very young, in different small business, he also directed several short film and music video. Quickly, his professional interests have centered on architecture, this topics has always been an integral part of his life, his father and his mother being architectural book publisher.

Career

Architectural approach
Julien Labrousse illustrates the implementation of a modern craft; a shape which is sensitized to innovation. His wish is to be able to control his activities and to live in an environment that he likes, perhaps in an illusory, free and independent way. In fact, he consciously or unconsciously manages his development according to his potential resources, while room operators and operators for cultural equipment are evolving more and more in an institutional and normative environment.

Philosophy
His philosophy on human resource management avoids any coercive approach, and the approach favours decentralisation, even if the term is a little bit ridiculous, he responds to this idea by saying that; centralization in business management focuses on order, while decentralization focuses on freedom. Decisions are taken collectively and he values every point of view.

Julien Labrousse had traveled and done several jobs. As a result, he has a large opening to the world. He is also a self-made man in the sense that he has developed a personality on his own. He has acquired various professional experiences at all levels.
Endowed with entrepreneurial skills, focusing on his idiosyncratic skills, he strives to do an original design, what seduces “alternative consumers” or “alternative producers” in other words; he builds ‘his’ market, without trying to compete directly with existing activities. With this in mind, he combines the mastery of a craft and the knowhow.

Reconstruction of Elysée Montmartre
This is the second time that the French architect and entrepreneur, Julien Labrousse is playing a vital role in the recovery and reconstruction of a theater in Paris, he has been able to bring a soul at his realisation place, something indescribable but that sets apart the Trianon and the Elysée Montmartre from other Parisian halls. Elysée Montmartre is one of the most famous concert venue in Paris where played many famous artist:, David Bowie, Daft Punk, Björk, red hot chili peppers, Wu-Tang Clan, Public Enemy, Cyndi Lauper. Elysée Montmartre is a French major cultural venue since 1807. This is where the French Cancan have been created. The soul Aristotle defines as  cause of the vital movement among the living. This seems to be the focal point of Julien Labrousse, he defends a musical architecture, for this reason, he can’t find a better subject than concert halls. It combines a little outdated and stylish pace, materials selected with precision. Project after project, we begin to discern a style in these various achievements. The Elysée Montmartre work was more complicated than the previous achievements, this project carried out with the collaboration of Jérôme Friant, necessitated the disbursement of 12,000 m3 of land, the realization of 180 piles and 250 tons of steel, a gigantic site in Paris which lasted for two and a half years.

Acquisitions
 Hôtel du Nord, 2005
 Galerie LHK, 2006
 Cococook, 2007
 Chacha, 2008
 Théâtre du Trianon, 2009
 Elysée Montmartre, 2014

References

1977 births
Living people
People from Ris-Orangis
French businesspeople